Monongahela is an extinct genus of prehistoric sarcopterygians or lobe-finned fish. There are currently no confirmed surviving specimens.

See also

 Sarcopterygii
 List of sarcopterygians
 List of prehistoric bony fish

References

Prehistoric lungfish genera